Art Strozier (May 23, 1946 – January 14, 2018) was an American football tight end. He played for the San Diego Chargers from 1970 to 1971.

He died on January 14, 2018, in Kansas City, Missouri at age 71.

References

1946 births
2018 deaths
American football tight ends
Kansas State Wildcats football players
San Diego Chargers players